Beatrice (also known as MDO-D, MDOM, Béa and 4-methyl-2,5-dimethoxymethamphetamine) is a lesser-known psychedelic drug.  It is a substituted methamphetamine and a homolog of 2,5-dimethoxy-4-methylamphetamine (DOM). Beatrice was first synthesized by Alexander Shulgin. In his book PiHKAL, the minimum dosage is listed as 30 mg, and the duration listed as 6–10 hours. Beatrice produces a vague feeling of openness and receptiveness, and causes a stimulative effect.  It also causes diarrhea.  Very little data exists about the pharmacological properties, metabolism, and toxicity of beatrice.

Legal Status

In the U.S., this substance is a Schedule 1 isomer of DOET.

See also 
 4-Methylmethamphetamine
 Phenethylamine
 Psychedelics, dissociatives and deliriants
 Ganesha (psychedelic)

References

Methamphetamines
2,5-Dimethoxyphenethylamines